Sovra is a small settlement in the Municipality of Žiri in the Upper Carniola region of Slovenia. It lies in the valley of Žirovnica Creek, a tributary of the Poljane Sora, south of the town of Žiri.

Name
Sovra was attested in written sources as Zaevr in 1318, Sewre in 1453, and Soure in 1500, among other spellings. The name of the village is originally a hydronym, sharing its name with the Sovra River, as the Poljane Sora is known in its upper course. The name is derived from the common noun *ső̜vьra with the original meaning 'flashy stream' or 'confluence'.

References

External links

Sovra on Geopedia

Populated places in the Municipality of Žiri